Overgrown Eden is the debut album from Essex rock band InMe. The album was released in the UK on 27 January 2003. The album produced four singles before and after the album's release. The singles released were "Underdose", "Firefly", "Crushed like Fruit" and "Neptune". The album was re-released in its original format on 5 June 2006. This was due to getting the rights for Overgrown Eden from the now defunct record label Music for Nations (which transferred to Zomba). Due to the demise of MFN, this was the first and last album released by InMe on this record label.

The highest UK Album Chart position was No. 15. However, it reached No. 1 in the Rock Album Chart.

Track listing
"Underdose" – 3:12
"Firefly" – 3:33
"Wounds" – 4:42
"Lava Twilight" – 4:38
"Natural" – 3:14
"Her Mask (P.A.)" – 5:21
"Energy" – 3:18
"Crushed Like Fruit" – 3:16
"Icewarm" – 5:00
"Trenches" – 3:10
"Neptune" – 3:48
"Mosaic" – 3:33

References

2003 debut albums
InMe albums
Music for Nations albums
V2 Records albums
Albums produced by Colin Richardson